The Donegal Times was a local newspaper in County Donegal, Ireland. The paper is based in Donegal Town. The paper acted like a newsletter, covering mainly community and social issues affecting the town and its immediate environs. It was first printed in March 1989 as a special supplement in the Donegal Democrat, but is now a stand-alone publication, ordinarily published on the second and fourth Wednesday of the month. Only one edition is published in December.

The Donegal Times is one of three papers that has a base in Donegal Town, the other two being the Donegal Democrat and the Donegal Post.  It uses a sketch of Donegal Castle as its logo. The paper eventually stopped updating its website with stories and now acts only as an archive of older articles.

The paper regularly takes a stance on issues that have polarized the community. High-profile examples are rows that erupted over reports on the Donegal Town Mart and the Donegal Bay Waterbus.

Liam Hyland, the editor, died on 9 September 2017, and the paper ceased publication.

References

1989 establishments in Ireland
Biweekly newspapers
Times
Times
Defunct newspapers published in Ireland
Newspapers established in 1989
Publications disestablished in 2017
2017 disestablishments in Ireland